German submarine U-2502 was a Type XXI U-boat (one of the "Elektroboote") of Nazi Germany's Kriegsmarine, built for service in World War II. The submarine was laid down on 25 April 1944 at the Blohm & Voss yard at Hamburg, launched on 15 June 1944, and commissioned on 19 July 1944 under the command of Kapitänleutnant Gert Mannesmann, who commanded her until 8 April 1945.

Design
Like all Type XXI U-boats, U-2502 had a displacement of  when at the surface and  while submerged. The submarine was powered by two MAN SE supercharged six-cylinder M6V40/46KBB diesel engines each providing , two Siemens-Schuckert GU365/30 double-acting electric motors each providing , and two Siemens-Schuckert silent running GV232/28 electric motors each providing .

U-2502 was fitted with six  torpedo tubes in the bow and four  C/30 anti-aircraft guns. She could carry twenty-three torpedoes or seventeen torpedoes and twelve mines. The complement was five officers and fifty-two men.

Fate
U-2502 conducted no patrols, and surrendered on 9 May 1945 in Horten Naval Base, Norway. She was then transferred to Oslo on 18 May 1945, then Scapa Flow on 6 June 1945. On 1 January 1946 she was taken to Moville, near Lisahally.

References

Bibliography

External links
 

Type XXI submarines
U-boats commissioned in 1944
U-boats sunk in 1946
World War II submarines of Germany
World War II shipwrecks in the Atlantic Ocean
1944 ships
Ships built in Hamburg
Operation Deadlight
Maritime incidents in 1946